Mexico participated at the 2018 Summer Youth Olympics in Buenos Aires, Argentina from 6 October to 18 October 2018.

Medalists

Archery

Mexico qualified two archers based on its performance at the 2017 World Archery Youth Championships.

 Individual

 Team

Athletics

Boy's Events Track and Field

Girl's Events Track and Field

Basketball

Mexico qualified a girls' team based on the U18 3x3 National Federation Ranking.

 Girls' tournament - 1 team of 4 athletes

 Shoot-out contest

Boxing

 Girls

Canoeing

Mexico qualified four boats based on its performance at the 2018 World Qualification Event.

 Boys' C1 - 1 boat
 Boys' K1 - 1 boat
 Girls' C1 - 1 boat
 Girls' K1 - 1 boat

Cycling

Mexico qualified a boys' and girls' combined team based on its ranking in the Youth Olympic Games Junior Nation Rankings. They also qualified a mixed BMX racing team based on its ranking in the Youth Olympic Games BMX Junior Nation Rankings.

Mixed Events

Diving

 Boys'

 Girls'

 Mixed Team

Equestrian

Mexico qualified a rider based on its performance at the FEI North American Junior Championships.

 Individual Jumping - 1 athlete

Nicole Meyer Robredo

Fencing

Mexico qualified two athletes based on its performance at the 2018 Cadet World Championship.

 Girls'

Boy's

 Mixed Team

Field Hockey

 Boys'
 Preliminary round

 Ninth and tenth place game

 Girls'
 Preliminary round

 Eleventh and twelfth place game

Golf

 Individual

 Team

Gymnastics

Artistic
Mexico qualified one gymnast based on its performance at the 2018 American Junior Championship.

Rhythmic
Mexico qualified one gymnast based on its performance at the 2018 American Junior Championship.

Trampoline
Mexico qualified one gymnast based on its performance at the 2018 American Junior Championship.

Modern pentathlon

Mexico qualified two pentathletes based on its performance at the Pan American Youth Olympic Games Qualifier.

Rowing

Mexico qualified one boat based on its performance at the 2017 World Junior Rowing Championships. They also qualified a boat in girls' single sculls based on their performance at the American Qualification Regatta.

 Boys' pair – 2 athletes
 Girls' single sculls - 1 athlete

Sailing

Mexico qualified two boats based on their performance at the North American Windsurfing Championship.

 Boys' Techno 293+ - 1 boat
 Girls' Techno 293+ - 1 boat

Shooting

Mexico qualified four sport shooters based on its performance at the American Qualification Tournament.

 Boys' 10m Air Rifle - 1 quota
 Boys' 10m Air Pistol - 1 quota
 Girls' 10m Air Rifle - 1 quota
 Girls' 10m Air Pistol - 1 quota

 Individual

 Mixed

Swimming

Triathlon

Mexico qualified two athletes based on its performance at the 2018 American Youth Olympic Games Qualifier.

 Individual

 Relay

Weightlifting

Mexico qualified two athletes based on its performance at the 2017 World Youth Championships.

 Boy

 Girl

Wrestling

Key:

  – Victory by Fall
  – Without any points scored by the opponent
  – With point(s) scored by the opponent
  – Without any points scored by the opponent
  – With point(s) scored by the opponent

 Boys

 Girls

References

2018 in Mexican sports
Nations at the 2018 Summer Youth Olympics
Mexico at the Youth Olympics